John Antila (February 6, 1902 – July 2, 1969) was an American businessman and politician.

Antila was born in Duluth, Minnesota and he lived with his wife and family in Duluth. He was involved in the bakery and grocery businesses. Antila served in the Minnesota House of Representatives from 1937 to 1944.

References

1902 births
1969 deaths
Businesspeople from Minnesota
Politicians from Duluth, Minnesota
Members of the Minnesota House of Representatives